A school band is a group of student musicians who rehearse and perform instrumental music together. A concert band is usually under the direction of one or more conductors (band directors). A school band consists of woodwind instruments, brass instruments and percussion instruments, although upper level bands may also have string basses or bass guitar.

School bands in the United Kingdom are generally similar to those in the US although pure brass bands are more commonplace in schools than in the US. Some countries usually prefer certain special types of bands, usually drums, over conventional ones. The school band movement in Japan is unusually strong, organized around an enormous competition system administered by the All-Japan Band Association. Many international observers of Japanese school bands consider them to be the most impressive in the world, particularly among very young students, and Japan is also home to one of the world's leading professional concert bands, the Tokyo Kosei Wind Orchestra.

History and origins

Middle school/Elementary school bands

Although some children learn an instrument prior to entering a middle school (or junior high), students in music education programs within the United States and Canada generally start daily band classes in the 6th or 7th Grade. Many band programs begin as early as 4th or 5th grade. The students usually make up a band based upon their grade, which may then be broken up into sectionals to provide better instrument-specific instruction. It is sometimes required for beginner students to play a recorder for a year before learning another instrument, so that basics, such as scales, embouchure, etc. can be taught easily.  Other requirements may include learning a piano or guitar to understand basic music theory, notation, etc.

A "beginning" band, consisting of the youngest students in the school, usually gives two or three concerts a year, and may participate in a local/state contest. These bands are given easy music to learn, often with many duplicate parts and simple rhythms. Students sometimes may be required to memorize the 12 major scales.
Depending upon the size of the school,  there may be one to three "higher level" bands after the beginning band. These bands are usually divided similarly to high school bands. Some schools require students to audition and be placed in a band according to their ability on their instrument. Others will assign students based on their performance as seen in class. Yet others will simply sort the students according to their age or grade level. Most of these decisions are decided by the conductor.  These higher level bands will occasionally play in high school games and pep rallies to augment the local high school band, although in small schools they always come to these events. Beginning bands usually are used in the spot of an elective.

Instruments typically in beginning bands:
 Woodwind:
 Flutes,
 Oboes,
 Clarinets,
 Alto, Tenor, and occasionally Baritone saxophones,
 Bassoons
 Brass:
 Tubas,
 Trombones,
 Trumpets,
 French horns,
 Baritones, or Euphoniums

Some bands will also have a percussion kit, which will allow them to play bells and drums

High school bands

High school bands typically challenge students musically more than those in middle school. Music is much more difficult with more complex passages, intricate rhythms and more involved phrasing. Selections also vary in style. A well-rounded band is expected to be able to play a wide variety of music, ranging from serious 'program music' to lighter 'pop-style' music. For many high school students, school bands are the main form of music education available to them in school. Marches were the first major contributions to the wind band repertoire.  There are many pieces other than marches written for wind band at present, but there are some historical standards that should be included into the repertoire of advanced ensembles.   Some of the most notable of these pieces are Holst's First Suite in E-flat and Second Suite in F, and Grainger's Children's March and Lincolnshire Posy among others.

Below is a list of the instrumentation in a typical concert band at the high school level. The number of instruments in each section varies, but listed below are usually the average number of members. Middle school/junior high bands are usually around the upper values for each instrument. Instrumentation in beginner bands is usually much larger than this. College and professional bands generally have smaller numbers of players. These numbers may vary widely, based on the instrument and the people playing them (as many people playing instruments such as trombones may drop out, causing others to change instruments to fill the need).  Some bands have a set number of performers per section while other bands have open unlimited participation.

Woodwind
 1 or no Piccolo in C
 8-10 Flutes
 1-2 Oboes
 1 or no English Horn
 1-2 Bassoons
 1 or no E♭ Clarinet
 8-24 B♭ Clarinets
 1 or no E♭ Alto Clarinet
 1-2  B♭ Bass Clarinets
 1 or no EE♭ Contra-alto Clarinet
 1 or no BB♭ Contrabass Clarinet
 1 or no B♭ Soprano Saxophone
 4-6 E♭ Alto Saxophones
 2-3 B♭ Tenor Saxophones
 1-2 E♭ Baritone Saxophones

Brass
 8-10 B♭ Trumpets
 4-6 Horns in F
 3-9 Trombones (sometimes including 1 Bass Trombone)
 1-4 Baritone horns or Euphoniums
 1-4 Tubas

Strings
 1 or no String Bass or Electric Bass

Percussion
 Percussionists playing:
 Snare drum
 Tom-toms
 Bass drum
 Cymbals including crash, ride, and suspended
 Tambourine
 2 playing Mallet Percussion, including orchestra bells, xylophone, marimba, chimes and vibraphone
 1 Timpani
 1 Drum kit
 A variety of other auxiliary percussion instruments used on specific pieces, including Cabasa, Triangle, and Maracas.

In most middle school bands, strings (besides the string bass) are not used. If they are, the band is generally considered an orchestra.

The first high school band in the United States was the Boston Farm and Trade School Band, founded in 1856.
The oldest high school band in America is The Christian Brothers Band (Memphis) founded in 1872.

College bands

Many colleges/universities have band as a class. Some are integrated within a 'Music' course while others are not. They tend to be larger than a high school band and play at a higher level.

Other school bands
There are many other school band opportunities for students. Most of these fall under the jurisdiction of the director that teaches the daily band classes, whether or not the smaller groups meet daily or during school hours.

Marching band

Many schools, especially high schools in the United States, have a marching band. A school marching band may contain from 11 to over 500 students.  Marching bands often practice frequently during the late summer and early fall and most often attend their school's football games, playing music in the stands, and marching a show during halftime. A show is usually between 6 and 10 minutes long, but many competitions place restrictions on length. Bands often compete in marching band competitions throughout the marching season (typically the same time as football season). Competitions vary in intensity. Some areas have many smaller, local competitions hosted by individual schools. Others host a regional competition.  Others, such as Bands of America competitions are nationally known and take place in professional arenas.

In addition to their show, marching bands often march parades. Often this is limited to their city or town's municipal parades, but some bands travel to participate in well known parades, such as the Macy's Thanksgiving Day Parade or the Tournament of Roses Parade on New Years Day.

Jazz band

Many schools have jazz programs in addition to their concert program. Different schools have different time slots for their jazz band. Some meet as an actual class during the school day, while others may choose to practice after school or before school two or three times a week. Meeting as a class during school can often cause schedule conflicts with students' academic classes.  Many times jazz band may rehearse during the study hall, free period, or part of the  lunch period. Typical instrumentation for jazz ensembles will include trumpets, trombones, alto, tenor and baritone saxophones, a drum set (often called a "trap set"), guitar, bass guitar, piano, clarinet and often, a vibraphone or marimba. Many areas have jazz festivals, but the popularity of these widely vary from different regions of the country. Jazz bands are most often used as an ambassador ensemble for the band program as a whole.  In addition, jazz education is seen as growing in popularity as a specialty area within school music departments.

Chamber ensembles
Schools rarely have chamber music ensembles that meet as real classes, usually depending on the region, state and budget. Most of these groups are ad hoc ensembles put together by the director or the students themselves for a contest or recital. Examples would be clarinet quartets, woodwind quintet, brass quintet, duets, and trios. Groups consisting of the entire woodwind or brass section, or even percussion section of a band are also sometimes formed.

All-region bands
Perhaps not associated with the individual school, All-Region bands are audition-only groups for the most advanced players in each school. There are many different "All-Region" bands, ranging from the most local "All-County" or "All-District"(when referring to school districts) to the more prestigious "All-State".  Many states also have a level between County and State bands which varies in name according to the area. These events are often highly enjoyed by the students that attend them. Musical literature is often increased in difficulty for the concerts, providing a challenge that isn't seen at schools. Students also get to meet new players on their instrument and share stories from their own band experiences. Region bands typically last over a weekend, though some may meet for over a week before performing a concert.

Though not associated with All-State, Florida has a statewide band festival called Festival of Winds, held in Tampa at The University of South Florida in the first weekend of December. Also, Florida, Alabama, and Georgia have a band festival called Tri-State, held in Tallahassee, Florida at Florida State University in the same time period as Festival of Winds.

Modern band

Modern band   is an instrumental and vocal school music program taught in a growing number of public schools systems in the U.S.  Instrumentation typically includes acoustic guitar, electric guitar, electric bass, keyboard, vocals, computers and percussion instruments. The repertoire of modern band is evolving as it draws from commercially dominant and contemporary music styles of the day such as pop, rock, disco, reggae, hip-hop and more.

Major public school systems that offer Modern Band programming include those in the New York City Department of Education, Los Angeles Unified School District, Chicago Public Schools and others. Modern band is a new movement in public school music education circles. The term "Modern Band" was coined by a music education non-profit, Music Will, which partners with school districts from economically challenged communities to expand their music programs.

Stereotypes and popular culture

'Band geek'

"Band geek" or "band nerd" is a high school stereotype of a person obsessed with playing band music. However, the term usually relates to the belief that most people who are in school bands are socially inept. The term is sometimes used to describe any student who plays an instrument and is in a band class (including students in the orchestra).   "Orch dork" is a variation specifically for members of school orchestras. These terms have become a label of pride for many band members, being found on T-shirts, bumper stickers, etc.

Gender stereotypes in instrument selection
In school bands, women tend to play woodwind instruments (especially the flute) and men tend to play brass, percussion (especially drums) and the saxophone.  However, this is not always the case.

These stereotypes can be avoided when band directors assess each student for musical capacity, as well as, meet with students individually to analyze their physical characteristics.  For example, petite students would be more successful playing the clarinet over the tuba.  Additionally, the role of gender bias in musical instrument assignment is highly debated in the field of music education.  Some feel that it should be left alone while others want to combat it.  One way band directors can overcome these stereotypes is to have live demonstrations from musicians playing gender atypical instruments (i.e., males playing flute, females playing tuba).

Movies
 Popular films with school bands in their storylines:
 Strike Up the Band, 1940
 A musical regarding a teen's attempt to meet director Mr. Paul Whiteman.
 Mr. Holland's Opus, 1995
 A struggling composer ends up making an impact on the lives of high schoolers through music.
 Band, 1998
 A reflection of a school's marching band from summer camp to competition and everything in between.
 American Pie Series, (American Pie 2 2001); American Pie Band Camp 2005)
 Although a movie about teen angst, a male teen falls for a female "band geek".
 Drumline, 2002
 The members of a collegiate marching band fight their way to get noticed by its director.
 Popular collegiate marching bands used in films
 USC Trojan Marching Band, over 13 films and 48 Television Shows
 UCLA Bruin Marching Band, over 20 films
 Popular collegiate marching bands used in film soundtracks
 University of Southern California Marching Band, 1 film
 Los Angeles CA Marching Band, 1 film
 Other collegiate bands in movies
 The University of North Alabama Pride of Dixie Marching Band was featured in the 1994 Academy Award-winning movie Blue Sky

See also
 Music in the Parks
 Buraban
 School Bands in Singapore

References
 Devito, D.R. (2002). A survey of beginning band methods for elementary, middle, and high school band programs.

External links

 School Marching Band and Concert Band Links 
 Heritage Festivals
 National School Band Association (UK)

Music education
Marching bands
Types of musical groups